Summit Lake is a very small tarn (cirque lake) located above the tree line within the Hatcher Pass of the Talkeetna Mountains in Willow, Alaska, United States.

Description

The lake is situated within (and is the namesake of) the Summit Lake Recreation Site The lake is fed directly by springs and snow fields and flows via a waterfall into beginning of Willow Creek. Willow Creek feeds into the Susitna River, which empties into the Cook Inlet of the Gulf of Alaska.

While lake is very small, it is still a very popular site for photography. In addition to the lake's very scenic views in the summer, the area is also a destination for hiking and paragliding. In winter, the area is also popular for backcountry winter sports and access to the area is maintained year-round. However, complete access through the pass (including access from Willow) is usually not possible until early July. The lake itself is accessed from the gravel road by a wide, but short and fairly rocky trail.

See also
 List of lakes of Alaska

Notes

References

External links
 Summit Lake State Recreation Site (Alaska Department of Natural Resources: Division of Parks and Outdoor Recreation webpage)
 Summit Lake State Recreational Site (another Alaska Department of Natural Resources: Division of Parks and Outdoor Recreation webpage)
 Hatcher Pass East Management Area brochure
 
 
 The April Bowl Trail (Alaska at Sunrise blog page, by Ron Day)

Lakes of Alaska
Lakes of Matanuska-Susitna Borough, Alaska